Crisscross heart is a type of congenital heart defect where the right atrium is closely associated with the left ventricle in space, and the left atrium is closely associated with the right ventricle.

Although it is classified as a defect, the criss-cross is more of a spatial anomaly than a functional one, and it is possible for the heart to have relatively normal functioning. The ventricles are rotated either clockwise or counterclockwise resulting in the twisting of their connection. The actual blood flow stream through the ventricles is not interrupted.

Symptoms and  signs
Crisscross heart is a very rare congenital heart defect, and results in many different symptoms, even though the heart still has the ability to perform its major function of pumping blood throughout the body. Individuals who have this disease will experience cyanosis which is a blue tint to the skin because of inadequate blood flow to the body, this symptom will be seen especially around the mouth. Other symptoms include pallor, extreme dyspnea, pulmonary valve stenosis, cardiac murmurs and a deviated ventricular septum. Pallor can be described as a pale color of the skin, and dyspnea is difficulty breathing. Pulmonary valve stenosis is the narrowing of the pulmonary valve which leads to decreased blood flow to the pulmonary artery. Cardiac murmurs are sounds that can be heard when using a stethoscope that make a swooshing noise rather than a normal “lub-dup”. Lastly a deviated ventricular septum is when there is a hole between the ventricle walls resulting in blood between the ventricles flowing freely between each other.

Anatomy 
In an anatomically correct heart the right atrium and right ventricle are working together to supply blood to the pulmonary artery, similarly to how the left atrium and the left ventricle work simultaneously to supply blood to the aorta. During the process of the heart contracting and releasing the right atrium and left atrium contract at the same time, while the left ventricle and right ventricle relax. In opposition, when the left atrium and right atrium are relaxed the left ventricle and right ventricle contract pushing blood to either the aorta or pulmonary artery. In an anatomically correct heart the atria are smaller than the ventricles. The ventricles include more muscle in order to push high quantities of blood throughout the body. Normal blood flow throughout the heart begins at the superior vena cava coming from the upper half of the body and the inferior vena cava coming from the lower half of the body. Next blood will be in the right atrium and will flow uninterrupted through the tricuspid valve through to the right ventricle. The blood from the right ventricle should go to the pulmonary artery via the pulmonary valve. The blood from the pulmonary vein enters the left atrium, then flows through the mitral valve to the left ventricle. After the left ventricle is filled with blood the aortic valve opens allowing blood to go through, which the blood then enters the aorta and goes to the rest of the body.

Diagnosis 
Crisscross heart can be diagnosed by an echocardiogram, angiocardiogram, and a cardiac MRI. To diagnose crisscross heart during embryonic development a sonogram will be used, and it is very important identify the disease prenatally so the child can be treated immediately for better cardiac function in adulthood.

Treatment
Without treatment crisscross heart can be fatal. The treatment is aimed to fix a deviated septum and pulmonary valve stenosis rather than the rotated heart itself.

References

Further reading

External links 

Congenital heart defects